The 2020 Henry Ford Health System 200 was the 11th stock car racing of the 2020 NASCAR Gander RV & Outdoors Truck Series season, and the 21st iteration of the event. The race was held on August 7, 2020 in Brooklyn, Michigan at Michigan International Speedway, a two-mile (3.2 km) permanent moderate-banked D-shaped speedway. The race was extended from 100 laps to 107 due to multiple NASCAR overtime attempts. After a chaotic ending that saw the leader spinning on the last lap, Zane Smith of GMS Racing would survive the carnage of the day and win his first ever NASCAR Gander RV & Outdoors Truck Series race. To fill the podium, Christian Eckes of Kyle Busch Motorsports and Tanner Gray of DGR-Crosley finished second and third, respectively.

Background 
The race was held at Michigan International Speedway, a two-mile (3.2 km) moderate-banked D-shaped speedway located in Brooklyn, Michigan. The track is used primarily for NASCAR events. It is known as a "sister track" to Texas World Speedway as MIS's oval design was a direct basis of TWS, with moderate modifications to the banking in the corners, and was used as the basis of Auto Club Speedway. The track is owned by International Speedway Corporation. Michigan International Speedway is recognized as one of motorsports' premier facilities because of its wide racing surface and high banking (by open-wheel standards; the 18-degree banking is modest by stock car standards).

Entry list 

*Withdrew due to Davis having a positive COVID-19 test.

Qualifying 
Qualifying was determined by a random draw. Chandler Smith of Kyle Busch Motorsports would draw the pole.

Race results 
Stage 1 Laps: 20

Stage 2 Laps: 20

Stage 3 Laps: 67

References 

2020 NASCAR Gander RV & Outdoors Truck Series
NASCAR races at Michigan International Speedway
August 2020 sports events in the United States
2020 in sports in Michigan